China Communications may refer to either
China Communications Construction Company
China Communications (journal)